The Campanile of Trinity College Dublin is a bell tower and one of its most iconic landmarks. Donated by then Archbishop of Armagh, Lord John Beresford it was designed by Sir Charles Lanyon, sculpted by Thomas Kirk and finished in 1853.

Location
It is located in what is considered the middle of Trinity College, however its actual location is in the northwest of college (the actual middle being the Museum Building). At the central axis of the college's Library Square, to the north is the Graduates Memorial Building, south the college's Old Library, east The Rubrics, to the west Trinity College's Front Gate and Regent House.  It is the most recent bell tower in a long line dating back to the original tower of the monastery of All Hallows.

Design
Lanyon had originally intended the campanile to be linked to the buildings on either side (Old Library and Graduates Memorial Building) by an "arcaded screen", however this was never realised.

Base
The base has paired rusticated Doric pilasters with portland entablature blocks. Between each pillar of the base are four round-headed arches, and each archway has a keystone. These keystones each have detailed carved heads, which depict Homer, Socrates, Plato and Demosthenes - representing the liberal arts.

Before the belfry, is a stepped circular base made of granite. At the corners of the campanile, seated and supported by this circular base are the Higher Faculties represented in four deceptive figures of Divinity, Science, Medicine and Law sculpted from portland stone by Irish sculptor Thomas Kirk.

Belfry
The belfry is a cylindrical chamber encircled by Corinthian columns, between which are tall, round-head traceried windows with cast iron grills.

The base of the belfry also has four carved coats of arms at each side, almost directly above the carved keystone faces below. Each coat of arms faces out onto a prominent location in the college, and symbolize strong connections it had with external forces.

These four coats of arms are those of:
Royal coat of arms of the United Kingdom, from 1837. It faces onto Parliament Square. 
Trinity College Dublin, though a 19th-century variant, with the Lion Passant Guardian rather than simply Passant and the Castle towers are Flamant rather than domed. This is slightly different from the original of the college, and can also be seen on the Museum Building. It faces onto Library Square.
Arms of Lord John Beresford, the second son of the first Marquess of Waterford, who was the Chancellor of the University. It faces onto Botany Bay.
Archbishopric of Armagh, and impaled with those of Lord John Beresford. It faces onto Fellows’ Square.

Dome and lantern
Over the belfry are two domes which are covered in decorative scale-patterns. The first is the larger of the two and has carved scrollwork ribs that continue vertically from the columns of the belfry. The smaller dome sits directly above the larger, commonly referred to as a lantern rather than a dome. The entire campanile is then topped by a gilded cross.

Tradition and Superstition
A college tradition and superstition holds that any student who passes beneath the campanile when the bell tolls will fail their exams, causing some to never pass under it until they finish their time at Trinity College.. There is another student legend that the bell will ring automatically when a virgin stands underneath it. This was the subject of a cartoon in Trinity News c. 1966, by Nick Robinson, which showed a forlorn student couple standing under the Campanile while the bell remained silent. The boy says to the girl "Maybe if you jump up and down a little".

The campanile is also featured in the bouldering tradition of the Dublin University Climbing Club. Climbing the campanile under cover of night is considered the "most impressive climb, and one of the most difficult" attempted by club members on college grounds.

References

External links
Virtual Tour
Trinity College Dublin

Buildings and structures completed in 1853
Buildings and structures in Dublin (city)
Buildings and structures of Trinity College Dublin
19th-century architecture in the Republic of Ireland